The large elaenia (Elaenia spectabilis) is a species of bird in the family Tyrannidae. It is found in South America from western Amazonia to eastern Brazil and central Bolivia. Its natural habitats are subtropical or tropical moist lowland forest and heavily degraded former forest.

References

External links

Large elaenia: photo, vocalizations, notes from The Birds of the Interior of Ceará, Brazil

large elaenia
Birds of Brazil
Birds of Paraguay
Birds of South America
large elaenia
large elaenia
Taxonomy articles created by Polbot